Route 17 is a primary north–south state route beginning in New Haven, through Middletown, and ending in Glastonbury, with a length of .

Route description
Route 80 begins at the interchange and continues eastward while Route 17 turns northward. Route 17 is a 4-lane principal arterial road, becoming 2 lanes as it passes through North Haven, Northford (where it briefly overlaps with Route 22), and Durham. In Middletown it becomes a 4-lane freeway for  leading to an interchange with the Route 9 freeway. Just after the bridge, it spawns a  alternate, Route 17A, which leads to the center of town. Routes 17 and 66 become a 4 lane principal arterial for the rest of the concurrency, where Route 17 turns north and becomes a secondary 2-lane arterial. After meeting the northern end of Route 17A, it enters Glastonbury, passing through the South Glastonbury Historic District and gradually becoming more suburban. The last  of Route 17 is a freeway, which ultimately merges into Route 2 West at Exit 7.

The southern surface road section from New Haven to Middletown is also known as George Washington Memorial Highway. The  freeway section from South Main Street to Route 9 in Middletown is known as the Catholic War Veterans Memorial Highway. A  section in Durham, from the junction with Route 77 to just north of the junction with Route 68, is a designated state scenic road.

History
The road between New Haven and Middletown via Durham was one of the routes used by the Boston Post Road in colonial times. In 1813, the road became a private turnpike known as the Middletown, Durham and New Haven Turnpike. The turnpike corporation was dissolved in the late 19th century. By 1922, Connecticut had numbered roads that were maintained by the state, which included all of modern Route 17. The roads were designated as Highway 114 from New Haven to Durham; part of Highway 112 from Durham to Middletown; and Highway 104 from Middletown to Glastonbury.

In the 1932 state highway renumbering, the road from New Haven to Glastonbury became part of the newly established Route 15. At that time, Route 15 used all of modern Route 17, then continued north along Main Street in East Hartford, then northeast via modern Route 30, Route 190, and Route 171 to the Massachusetts state line. In 1948, the Route 15 designation was reassigned to the Merritt Parkway, Wilbur Cross Parkway, Berlin Turnpike, and Wilbur Cross Highway. The old Route 15 south of Glastonbury was renumbered to Route 17.

Junction list
Exit numbers are currently unnumbered, but will receive mile-based exit numbers starting in 2021 as part of ongoing sign replacement projects.

Route 17A

It serves as the Main Street of the town. The original Route 17 (then Route 15) used the 17A alignment. The main route bypassed the town center by 1940 and Main Street became Route 15A. When Route 15 was relocated and the route through Portland became Route 17, Route 15A was also renumbered to 17A.

See also

References

External links

017
Transportation in New Haven County, Connecticut
Transportation in Middlesex County, Connecticut
Transportation in Hartford County, Connecticut